Sitting Ducks is a CGI-animated children's television series based on the 1977 "Sitting Ducks" lithograph and the 1998 children's book of the same name, created by the poster artist Michael Bedard. The series first premiered internationally before debuting in the United States on Cartoon Network.

The show lasted for two seasons each comprising thirteen episodes, with the last episode shown on July 5, 2003.

Background
Sitting Ducks takes place in a 1970’s-style town called Ducktown, and stars the duck Bill who likes to drink milkshakes, play “bucket-ball” (basketball), and hang out with his best friend Aldo, the alligator.

Bill (Ian James Corlett) likes to live a more laid-back life, such as his peaceful hobby of painting, and his affinity for flight, and ponders about ducks taking flight. He shares the building with his next-door neighbors, the three duck brothers Ed, Oly, and Waddle (Louis Chirillo, Phil Hayes, and Jay Brazeau respectively), who like to pilfer Bill’s fridge looking for snacks. Bill also shares his building with Fred (Phil Hayes), a melancholy penguin who is an immigrant from Antarctica, who now lives in Ducktown.

Aldo (Dave Squatch Ward) lives in the neighboring town of Swampwood, who is Bill’s best friend. He likes to spend his leisure time by bowling, working at the bowling ball factory, and spending time with Bill. He sometimes has an urge to eat ducks that turns up every once in a while. He constantly tries to turn down other gators’ offers for duck-related meals, even getting pressured to terminate his relationship with Bill.

Episodes

Characters

Bill (voiced by Ian James Corlett) – An anthropomorphic diminutive duck who waddles to a different beat. A very kind-hearted, good-natured fellow who is always there when needed. One of his dreams is to fly. With the help of his friend Dr. Cecil, he tries again and again to fly, and eventually is told that the reason he cannot is because ducks became too terrestrial. Bill's main appearance difference, apart from his smallness, is his bow tie (usually red) which he changes every year at the Ducktown Picnic. Bill lives in an apartment with his pet parrot, Jerry. He has been called a "gator lover" for his rare efforts to turn alligators into allies of Ducktown.
Aldo (voiced by Dave Ward) – A lumbering but kind-hearted alligator from the town of Swampwood. He is Bill's best friend, though he often receives grief from his fellow gators on being a "duck lover". Has a blind uncle named Artie and a younger cousin named Andy. Once was the cook at the bowling ball factory, he transferred to the assembly line after he befriended Bill, as he did not want to cook any more ducks. He also fights urges so he will not eat ducks.
Bev (voiced by Kathleen Barr) – Owner of the Decoy Cafe, where many ducks go to eat. She is a sweet duck who also has an alias, Madam Bevousky, as whom she offers fortune telling services to the residents of Ducktown. She is also the focus of Bill's romantic interests.
Ed, Oly, and Waddle (voiced by Louis Chirillo, Phil Hayes, and Jay Brazeau respectively) – Three brothers and friends of Bill who live next door to him. These three goofy and lazy freeloaders are similar to The Three Stooges and tend to scheme their way into things and are usually the ones behind some plot or a practical joke, from which they always try to distance themselves when things go awry. Ed wears a tropical shirt and speaks with a New York accent. Oly wears a green beret, has big, soft feathers (as seen in "Fowl Weather Feathers") and speaks with a "beatnik" accent. Waddle is the shortest, fattest, and youngest and has a childish voice.
Cecil (voiced by Ian James Corlett) – Ducktown's only dentist and an inventor, Cecil speaks in a British accent and is always there to offer advice to Bill or the others. Naturally, Aldo is typically his only customer, being the only person in town who actually has teeth. He also provides beak adjustments for the ducks.
Claire – Cecil's wife who was scared of alligators, just like Aldo in the first episode.
Fred (voiced by Phil Hayes) – a melancholy, but sometimes nervously hyper penguin, who migrated from Antarctica to Ducktown, in which he has citizenship. He's somewhat of a loner most of the time, always seen surrounding himself with bags of ice or air conditioning to remain comfortable in the intolerable (to him) heat. Has a duck girlfriend, Dot Cable, and a stylish cousin, Gelata.
Raoul (voiced by Michael Benyaer) – A Latin-accented crow who tends to be the freeloading troublemaker in Ducktown, and likes trading insults with Bill. He especially enjoys mocking Bill's attempts to fly.
Drill Sergeant Duck (Cathy Weseluck) – A tough police duck who makes it hard for Aldo to come into Ducktown, as she also is the leader of the Duck Defense League, an anti-gator organization, and the Ducktown Scooter Shop and Driver Station.
Other characters that have appeared in the show have been voiced by Dale Wilson, Brian Dobson, Sylvia Zaradic, Chantal Strand, Chiara Zanni, Pauline Newstone, Paul Dobson, Lee Tockar, Garry Chalk, and Scott McNeil.

Broadcast
The series aired in Australia on ABC3 and Nickelodeon, in Canada on CBC Television and YTV, in the United Kingdom on CITV and Boomerang, and on the Japanese version of Cartoon Network.

Home media

VHS releases

DVD releases

Merchandise
Sitting Ducks proved to be a big hit with the European children's show market, and as a result toys, clothing and other merchandise were created.

Print
The cartoon itself also spawned a few books. Quacking Up is a joke book written by Rick Walton featuring the characters from the TV show, and multiple children's picture books by Danielle Mentzer and Annmarie Harris based on various episodes. The books were released in 2004, roughly one year after the show had ended.

Video games
In May 2003, Light and Shadow Production picked up the rights from Universal to create games for Sitting Ducks.

PlayStation 2/Microsoft Windows
Developed by Asobo Studio, the PlayStation 2 and Microsoft Windows versions are 3D action-adventure titles where the player controls Bill and Aldo in different missions based on episodes from the show, with a Multiplayer racing mode also available. An Xbox release was also planned, but was cancelled.

PlayStation/Game Boy Advance
Developed in-house at Light & Shadow Production with The Code Monkeys assisting the PlayStation version, the PlayStation and Game Boy Advance versions are top-view adventure games where the player can control Bill, Aldo and Fred. It also features a different storyline than the PS2/Windows version.

References

External links
 

2000s American animated television series
2001 American television series debuts
2003 American television series endings
2000s Canadian animated television series
2001 Canadian television series debuts
2003 Canadian television series endings
American children's animated comedy television series
American television shows based on children's books
American computer-animated television series
Canadian children's animated comedy television series
Canadian television shows based on children's books
Canadian computer-animated television series
Animated television series about ducks
Animated television series about reptiles and amphibians
Animated television series about penguins
Animated television series about birds
Television series by Universal Animation Studios
Cartoon Network original programming
English-language television shows
Qubo
Fictional crocodilians